The 2022–23 Vijay Hazare Trophy was the 21st season of the Vijay Hazare Trophy, a List A cricket tournament in India. It was played from 12 November to 2 December 2022. Himachal Pradesh were the defending champions. Saurashtra won the final match against Maharashtra by 5 wickets to clinch their second domestic title.

A total of 38 teams featured in five Elite groups. The group toppers progressed to the quarterfinals, while the second-placed sides and the best among the rest advanced to the pre-quarterfinals. The tournament was played in six cities across the country which are Bengaluru, Delhi, Kolkata, Mumbai, Ranchi, with all the knockout matches played in Ahmedabad.

On 21 November, Tamil Nadu's Narayan Jagadeesan set the highest-ever individual List A score with his 277 from 141 balls against Arunachal Pradesh, breaking the previous record of 268 by Ali Brown. Tamil Nadu's final score of 506/2 in that match was also a record for the highest-ever team total in a List A match, breaking England's 498/4 against the Netherlands set five months prior.

On 28 November, Ruturaj Gaikwad scored 43 runs of the second-last over of Maharashtra's innings against Uttar Pradesh in the second quarter-finals match, to equal the record for the most runs scored in an over in a List A match and also became the first batter to hit seven sixes in an over in all forms of cricket.

League stage

Group A

Group B

Group C

Group D

Group E

Knockout stage

Preliminary quarter-finals

Quarter-finals

Semi-finals

Final

References

External links
 Series home at ESPN Cricinfo

Vijay Hazare Trophy
Vijay Hazare Trophy